Wanee & Junah (lit. "Wa-ni and Jun-ha") is a 2001 South Korean film directed by Kim Yong-gyun.

Plot
Wa-ni is a successful animator in her mid-20s who is rapidly losing any ambition and passion for life. She's just surviving because of her job and her boyfriend's presence, the easygoing Jun-ha. Jun-ha struggles to establish himself as a writer without sacrificing the art in his work in order to acquire his first film credit. The two are live-in lovers, however, their relationship becomes emotionally distant as memories of Wa-ni's past surface. When her old friend So-young comes to visit Wa-ni, Jun-ha finally learns what's behind his girlfriend's sorrow that prevents Wa-ni from fully connecting with him.

Cast
Kim Hee-sun as Wa-ni
Joo Jin-mo as Jun-ha
Cho Seung-woo as Young-min
Choi Kang-hee as So-young
Kim Soo-jin as Young-sook
Go Jun

Awards and nominations

References

External links

South Korean romantic drama films
Films with live action and animation
2000s Korean-language films
2000s South Korean films